Savio Kabugo (born 20 January 1995) is a Ugandan professional footballer who currently plays for jwaneng galaxy fc in botswana.

Club career
Savio has traded his football in different clubs such as Victoria University SC, KCCA FC, URA FC and currently plays in Proline FC.

Victoria University 
After his good performance in the Fufa Super League, Uganda Cup and also at the Uganda, Savio earned himself a chance for trial at Bidvest Wits in June 2013.
In September 2014 while at the national team Savio Kabugo got an injury and his last club game in 2014 was in December against Bright Stars, which he was able to play after taking some pain killers.

KCCA FC
In January 2015  Savio joined  Kampala City Council Authority Football 
Savio Kabugo was among the KCCA FC players who got an accident while  traveling to Ntungamo ahead of a Uganda Cup final 2015 against SC Villa.

URA FC
On December 4, 2015 Savio Kabugo signed for URA FC on a one year deal. Kabugo played  six full games for the taxmen, URA’s 2-1 defeat to Express F.C in March 2016 was his last game in URA FC.

Proline FC
In August 2016 Savio Kabugo joined Proline Football Club 
On October 18, 2016  Savio Kabugo  scored   his first goal for Proline Football club against Sadolin paints F.C at the Kyabazinga Stadium in  Bugembe.

AS Vita Club
In December 2018, Savio joined AS Vita Club from SC Villa on a three year contract deal.

Sebeta City
On 31 October 2019, Savio moved to Ethiopian club Sebeta City.

International career
Savio Kabugo made his Uganda national team debut on 6 February 2013 at the Amahoro stadium, Kigali in an international friendly game between Uganda and Rwanda where the match ended 2-2. Kabugo played at the heart of defence partnering with Denis Guma.
Savio Kabugo is much remembered because of the ninth minute header which ensured a crucial 1-0 victory of Uganda over the fancied Ghanaians in the penultimate 2015 Nations Cup qualifier at Namboole stadium.
In January 2014, coach Milutin Sedrojevic, invited him to be a part of the Uganda squad for the 2014 African Nations Championship. The team placed third in the group stage of the competition after beating Burkina Faso, drawing with Zimbabwe and losing to Morocco.

Savio Kabugo was the Hero as Uganda Beat Ghana 1-0 At Namboole in an AFCON Qualifier in November 2014. His headed goal ensured that Cranes secured a much-needed win. On top of that, he was always imposing in aerial battles, many of which he won. Using his body, he was a man-mountain to go past including the several blocks and tackles he won.
After the match of Uganda  with Togo at Namboole stadium, Cranes defender Savio Kabugo was given a match jersey and also a pair of boots from Emmanuel Adebayor in the Cranes dressing room after impressing him in a match.

International goals

Personal life
Savio Kabugo lost both his parents at a tender age. He is a cousin to Ivan Bukenya, a Ugandan professional footballer who formerly played for Kaizer Chiefs in the South African Premier Soccer League.

Honours
SC Victoria University
 Ugandan Cup winner: 2013
 Ugandan Super Cup runner-up: 2013

Individual
 Uganda Footballer of the Year runner-up: 2014

References

External links
Goal profile
Newvision article

1995 births
Living people
Ugandan footballers
Ugandan expatriate footballers
Sportspeople from Kampala
Uganda international footballers
Association football defenders
SC Victoria University players
Kampala Capital City Authority FC players
Uganda Revenue Authority SC players
Proline FC players
SC Villa players
AS Vita Club players
Ugandan expatriate sportspeople in the Democratic Republic of the Congo
Ugandan expatriate sportspeople in Ethiopia
Expatriate footballers in the Democratic Republic of the Congo
Expatriate footballers in Ethiopia
Uganda A' international footballers
2014 African Nations Championship players